Canadas may refer to:
 The Canadas, Lower Canada and Upper Canada, collectively
 United Canadas, Canada East and Canada West, as a unit
 Canada geese, Branta canadensis
 Carlos Cañadas (born 1980), Salvadoran football player
 Esther Cañadas (born 1977), Spanish actress and model

See also
 Canada (disambiguation)
 Cañada (disambiguation)